Ruby Hill may refer to:

Ruby Hill, Denver
Ruby Hill, Nevada
Ruby Hill Terrain Park in Denver
Ruby Hill Railroad (List of Nevada railroads)
Ruby Hill Winery in the Livermore Valley AVA
Ruby Hill (singer) (1922–2004), American singer
Ruby Hill (bowls), English bowls player
Ruby Hill, character on the television show Good Girls played by Retta